Zur Namensfeier (French: Jour de fête, English: Feastday or Name day), Op. 115, is a symphonic overture in C major by Ludwig van Beethoven completed in 1815, and first performed on Christmas Day 1815. It is dedicated to Polish prince Antoni Radziwiłł, who is remembered for his patronage of the arts who supported others like Paganini, Goethe and Chopin. The piece was never one of Beethoven's more popular works and is seldom played today.

Its title refers to the feast of St Francis of Assisi, the name day of the Austrian emperor Franz I, 4 October, and while Beethoven made an attempt to complete the work for this day in 1814, he was unable to finish it in time, so he set aside work on it until the following spring. The theme at the beginning is related to that which he used to set Schiller's Ode to Joy in his Ninth Symphony nine years later.
In spite of its late opus number, it is a middle-period composition. Beethoven used ideas which he had sketched between 1810 and 1814; his earliest "late period" compositions are usually dated to 1816.

Notes

References 
 Lecompte Michel, Guide illustré de la musique symphonique de Beethoven, Fayard, 1995 
 Kerman, Joseph /Tyson, Alan: "Ludwig van Beethoven", Grove Music Online, ed. L. Macy (Retrieved 14 December 2006), (subscription access)

External links 
 

Compositions by Ludwig van Beethoven
1815 compositions
Overtures
Compositions in C major